"Chemicals" is a song by Australian singer and songwriter Dean Lewis. Released in March 2018 as the fourth and final single from his debut extended play Same Kind of Different (2017). The song had been streamed more than 12 million times prior to the single's release and has been called a "fan favourite".

Lewis said "'Chemicals' was one of those songs that kind of fell from the sky. As in one of those songs that you start writing and the words just come down and it feels complete. It's happened a few times and I'm thankful for when it does as it's not too overthought. To me, Chemicals is that feeling of being addicted to someone and them being around you." During a live performance in November 2017, Lewis added "My friends thought this song was about drugs."

Background and release
Lewis first performed "Chemicals" at a house in East London for the renowned UK Mahogany sessions. The YouTube recording received over 100,000 views and it was this recording that led to his signing with Island Records Australia in 2016.

Music video
The music video for "Chemicals" was directed by Mick Jones and released on 22 March 2018. The video tracks the relationship of a young couple who are struggling with the concept of being together, and stars Brayden Dalmazzone and Lana Kington.

Reception
In a review of the EP, Chelsea King from Forte Magazine said "While some of the tracks blur together, "Chemicals" is a song that stands out for its haunting nature. The lyrics "hold me I'm falling apart" are dappled throughout the song, creating an eerie sense."

Certifications

References

2018 singles
2016 songs
Dean Lewis songs
Universal Music Australia singles
Songs written by Dean Lewis